Portulaca bicolor is a succulent species of the family Portulacaceae with cylindrical leaves and red stems. Flowering all year the plant is common to coastal regions of Australia.

External links
Online Field guide to Common Saltmarsh Plants of Queensland

References 

bicolor
Taxa named by Ferdinand von Mueller